The mountain pipit (Anthus hoeschi) is a species of bird in the family Motacillidae.

It is found in Lesotho, South Africa, possibly Botswana, possibly Democratic Republic of the Congo, possibly Namibia, and possibly Zambia.
Its natural habitat is subtropical or tropical high-altitude grassland.

References

External links
 Mountain pipit - Species text in The Atlas of Southern African Birds.

mountain pipit
Birds of Southern Africa
mountain pipit
Taxonomy articles created by Polbot